Suleman Juma (born 23 June 1960) is a Kenyan weightlifter. He competed in the men's middle heavyweight event at the 1988 Summer Olympics.

References

1960 births
Living people
Kenyan male weightlifters
Olympic weightlifters of Kenya
Weightlifters at the 1988 Summer Olympics
Place of birth missing (living people)
20th-century Kenyan people